This is the discography of Swiss DJ and music producer EDX.

Studio albums
 2012: On the Edge
 2017: Two Decades

Other albums
 2011: No Xcuses – The Violet Edition
 2014: On the Edge – Remixed

Singles
 1997: "I'm Not Interested"
 1999: "Dancing with You" (with Leon Klein)
 2000: "Gonna Catch You" (with Leon Klein)
 2000: "Tango!" (with Leon Klein)
 2002: "Lift Me Up"
 2003: "I Need Love"
 2008: "Please Don’t Go" (with DJ Tatana as Dobenbeck featuring Joanna)
 2008: "Casa Grande"
 2009: "Shy Shy"
 2009: "Ready to Go" (with Chris Reece and Jerome Isma-Ae)
 2010: "Hoover"
 2010: "Don’t Stop Dancing" (with Kaskade)
 2010: "Out of the Rain" (featuring Tamra Keenan)
 2010: "Thrive"
 2011: "Embrace"
 2011: "Falling Out of Love" (featuring Sarah McLeod)
 2011: "D.A.N.C.E."
 2011: "Give It Up for Love" (with John Williams)
 2012: "This Is Your Life" (with Nadia Ali)
 2012: "Love Express" (with Seamus Haji feat. Jerique)
 2012: "Sunset Miracles"
 2012: "Everything" (featuring Hadley)
 2012: "Miami Device" (with Stan Kolev and Chris Reece)
 2012: "Touched"
 2013: "Blessed"
 2013: "The Sun" (with Leventina)
 2013: "Hazed"
 2013: "Live My Life"
 2013: "Acido"
 2013: "Hyped"
 2013: "Reckless Ardor"
 2014: "Cool You Off"
 2014: "Air for Life"
 2014: "Empathy"
 2014: "Collateral Effects"
 2014: "Breathin'"
 2014: "Make Me Feel Good"
 2015: "Remember House"
 2015: "Want You"
 2015: "Belong"
 2016: "Missing" (featuring Mingue)
 2016: "My Friend"
 2016: "Omertà"
 2016: "High on You"
 2017: "Dharma"
 2017: "All I Know"
 2017: "Bloom"
 2017: "We Can't Give Up"
 2017: "Feel The Rush"
 2018: "Jaded"
 2018: "Anthem"
 2018: "Sillage"
 2019: "Who Cares"
 2019: "Off the Grid" (with Amba Shepherd)
 2019: "Ubuntu"
 2019: "Stay"
 2019: "Neptune"
 2019: "Voltaic"
 2020: "Adore Me"
 2020: "The Time Is Now"
 2020: "I Found You (Neptune)" (featuring Jess Ball)
 2020: "Umoja"
 2020: "Indian Summer"
 2021: "Take Me Home" (featuring Jess Ball)
 2021: "Vommuli"
 2022: "Don't Be Afraid" (featuring Allie Crystal)

Selected remixes
2006:
 Fuzzy Hair and Steve Angello – "In Beat"
 Martin Solveig – "Rocking Music"

2007:
 Dubfire – "Roadkill"
 Sikk – "The Whisper"
 Sucker DJs – "Lotta Lovin'"
 Armin van Buuren – "The Sound of Goodbye"
 deadmau5 – "Arguru"

2008:
 John O’Callaghan – "Big Sky"
 Kaskade – "Angel on My Shoulder"
 Sebastian Ingrosso and Laidback Luke – "Chaa Chaa"
 Yves Larock – "Say Yeah"
 Axwell and Bob Sinclar – "What a Wonderful World"
 Robbie Rivera – "In Too Deep"

2009:
 Funkagenda – "Breakwater"
 Afrojack – "Radioman"
 Paul Harris feat. Sam Obernik – "The Take"
 ATB featuring Flanders – "Behind"
 Beyoncé – "Why You Don’t Love Me"
 Mary J. Blige – "Stronger"
 Roger Sanchez – "Get2Gether"

2010:
 Dinka – "Elements"
 Dannii Minogue – "You Won't Forget About Me"
 Roger Sanchez – "2Gether"
 Adam K – "My Love"
 Cedric Gervais – "Ready or Not"
 Nadia Ali – "Fantasy"
 Benny Benassi featuring Kelis and Apl.De.Ap – "Spaceship"

2011:
 Gala – "Freed from Desire"
 Gaia – "Stellar"

2012:
 Avicii – "Silhouettes"

2013:
 Cazzette – "Weapon"
 Calvin Harris – "Thinkin' About You"
 Avicii - "Wake Me Up"

2014:
 Calippo - "Back There"

2015:
 Sam Feldt - "Show Me Love" (featuring Kimberly Anne) (EDX's Indian Summer Remix)
 Spada featuring Anna Leyne – "Catchfire" (Sun Sun Sun)
 Robin Schulz featuring Francesco Yates - "Sugar"

2016
 EDX - "Roadkill" (EDX's Ibiza Sunrise Remix)

2017:
 Tiësto - "On My Way" (EDX's Miami Sunset Remix)
 Lika Morgan - "Feel The Same" (EDX's Dubai Skyline Remix)
 Haevn - "Finding Out More" (EDX's Acapulco At Night Remix)
 Charlie Puth - "How Long" (EDX's Dubai Skyline Remix)

2018:
 Janelle Monáe - "Make Me Feel" (EDX Dubai Skyline Remix)
 David Guetta featuring Anne-Marie - "Don't Leave Me Alone" (EDX's Indian Summer Remix)

2019
 Loud Luxury and Bryce Vine - "I'm Not Alright" (EDX's Dubai Skyline Remix)
 Charli XCX — "White Mercedes" (EDX's Miami Sunset Remix)

2020
 Tom Gregory — "What Love Is" (EDX's Acapulco At Night Remix)

2022
 Noa Kirel — "Thought About That" (EDX's Ibiza Sunset Remix)

References

Discographies of Swiss artists
House music discographies